Adria Jean LaViolette is an American archaeologist at the University of Virginia. She is a specialist in Swahili archaeology and is the joint editor of The Swahili World (Routledge, 2018).

Early life and education
Adria LaViolette is one of the four children of Paul A. LaViolette, Jr., and Jean Scully LaViolette.

She received her BA in 1977 from Yale University, her MA in 1981 from Washington University in St. Louis. Her PhD was also from Washington University in St. Louis in 1987 for a dissertation on the subject of "An Archaeological Ethnography of Blacksmiths, Potters and Masons in Jenné, Mali".

Career
LaViolette is an archaeologist at the University of Virginia where she specialises in Swahili archaeology. She is the joint editor with Stephanie Wynne-Jones of The Swahili World (Routledge, 2018).

Selected publications

1990s
 1990 - "Iron Age Settlement around Mkiu, South-eastern Tanzania". Azania 25:19-26. (With W. B. Fawcett). 
 1994 - "Masons of Mali: A Millennium of Design and Technology in Earthen Materials." In Society, Culture, and Technology in Africa. S. Terry Childs, ed. pp. 86–97. Philadelphia: MASCA Research Papers in Science and Archaeology.
 1995 - "Women Craft Specialists in Jenne: The Manipulation of Mande Social Categories". In Status and Identity in West Africa: Nyamakalaw of Mande. D. C. Conrad and B. E. Frank, eds. Bloomington: Indiana University Press.
 1999 - "Elusive Wattle and Daub: Finding the Hidden Majority in the Archaeology of the Swahili"  Azania (34) 87-108. (With Jeffrey Fleisher)

2000s
 2000 - Ethno-archaeology in Jenné, Mali: Craft and Status among Smiths, Potters and Masons.   Monographs in African Archaeology 49. British Archaeological Reports International Series. Oxford: Cambridge.
 2002 - Encountering Archaeology in Tanzania: Education, Development, and Dialogue at the University of Dar es Salaam. Anthropological Quarterly 75 (2):355-374.
 2004 - Swahili Archaeology and History on Pemba, Tanzania: A Critique and Case Study of the Use of Written and Oral Sources in Archaeology. In African Historical Archaeologies.  A. M. Reid and P. J. Lane, eds. pp. 125–162. Kluwer Academic: Plenum Publishers.
 2005 - Encountering Archaeology in Tanzania: Experience in Teaching at the University of Dar es Salaam. In Salvaging Tanzania's Cultural Heritage. B. B. B. Mapunda and P. Msemwa, eds. pp. 36–54. Dar es Salaam University Press.
 2005 - The Archaeology of Sub-Saharan Urbanism: Cities and their Countrysides. In African Archaeology: A Critical Introduction. A. B. Stahl, ed. pp. 327–352. (With J. Fleisher). London: Blackwell.
 2007 - Geographic Overviews, Africa, East: Swahili Coast. In Encyclopedia of Archaeology. D. M. Pearsall, ed. pp. 19–21. New York: Academic Press.
 2007 - The Changing Power of Swahili Houses, Fourteenth to Nineteenth Centuries A.D. In The Durable House: House Society Models in Archaeology. Robin A. Beck, Jr., ed. pp. 175–197. (With J. Fleisher). Center for Archaeological Investigations, Southern Illinois University.
 2008 - 'Bead Grinders' and Early Swahili Household Economy: Analysis of an Assemblage from Tumbe, Pemba Island, Tanzania, 7th-10th Centuries AD. Journal of African Archaeology 6 (2):161-181. (With J. Flexner and J. Fleisher).
 2008 - Swahili Cosmopolitanism in Africa and the Indian Ocean World, A.D. 600–1500. Archaeologies: Journal of the World Archaeological Congress 4 (1):24-49.
 2009 - The Urban History of a Rural Place: Swahili Archaeology on Pemba Island, Tanzania, AD 700–1500. International Journal of African Historical Studies 42 (3):433-455.  (With J. Fleisher).
 2009 - The Archaeology of African History. Special Issue, International Journal of African Historical Studies 42 (3). (Ed. with Ann B. Stahl).

2010s
 2013 - The Early Swahili Trade Village of Tumbe, Pemba Island, Tanzania, AD 600–950. Antiquity 87 (338): 1151–1168.. (With J. Fleisher).
 2013 - The Swahili World. Oxford Handbook of African Archaeology. Oxford University Press (Ch.62) 901-914 (Ed. P.Mitchell and P. Lane)
 2013 - Swahili Historical Chronicles from an Archaeological Perspective: Bridging History and Archaeology, and Coast and Hinterland, in Southern Tanzania. In The Death of Prehistory.  P. Schmidt and S. Mrozowski, eds. pp. 117–140 (With M. Pawlowicz). Oxford: Oxford University Press.
 2015 - When Did the Swahili become Maritime? Jeffrey Fleisher, Paul Lane, Adria LaViolette, Annalisa Christie, Mark Horton, Edward Pollard, Erendira Quintana Morales, Thomas Vernet, and  Stephanie Wynne-Jones. American Anthropologist 117(1): 100–115.

References

External links

Living people
Year of birth missing (living people)
20th-century American archaeologists
20th-century American women
21st-century American archaeologists
21st-century American women
American women archaeologists
Archaeologists of Africa
American women academics
University of Virginia faculty
Washington University in St. Louis alumni
Yale University alumni